Gurholi is a village in Purandar Taluka, India, with an economy based mainly on agriculture where fruits such as figs, custard apples, and pomegranates are produced. The village is surrounded by three mountains, and has temples among the mountains.

Gurholi is 21 kilometers from Jejuri, 18 kilometers from Saswad, and 16 kilometers from Uruli Kanchan.

Geography
It has an average elevation of 700 metres (2303 feet). It is bordered by Walti and Alandi mhatobachi town on the north, Sonawari town on the west Vanpuri and Pargaon towns on the south, Waghapur and Singapur town on the west. It is situated at a distance of 160 km from the Maharashtra State Capital of Mumbai by road. Gurholi is at a distance of 30 km from District main City Pune and 70 km from Baramati. Gurholi is at a distance of 18 km from Taluka main city Saswad and 21 km from Jejuri and 16  from Uruli Kanchan. Gurholi is situated on Deccan plateau.

It has good connectivity with nearby cities like Saswad, Uruli and Jejuri. It is the village which lies in the Middle region of the Pune district of Maharashtra state.
It is 3 km from State highway no SH-61. The local language spoken in Guroli is Marathi.

Guroli has divided into the following residential areas:
Guroli Gavthan
PanhalWadi
Indiranagar
Patil Wasti
Maske Wasti
Shivnagar
Kharade Wasti
Vikas Wadi
Lalwadi
Jadhav Wadi
Rajebacha Mala

Transport
Buses run from Saswad S.T. stand to Gurholi. Buses running on routes from Saswad are Yawat, Uruli Kanchan, Darekar (Tamhanwadi) wadi and from Uruli to Saswad). There is much service on the Saswad - Urulikanchan Road. There is a ST bus from Gurholi to Swargate.

Educational facility
Jilha Parihsad Prathmik school.(standard 1 to 4)
New English School Gurholi.(Standard 5 to 10).

Both schools are under Pune University and Maharashtra Board.

Climate

Gurholi has a dry climate. The city experiences three distinct seasons: summer, monsoon and winter. The warmest months in Gurholi are May. The monsoon lasts from June to end of September, with moderate rainfall. Winter months are October to January.

Demography

Gurholi is a medium size village located in Purandhar of Pune district, Maharashtra with total 426 families residing. The Gurholi village has population of 1941 of which 968 are males while 973 are females as per Population Census 2011.

In Gurholi village population of children with age 0-6 is 189 which makes up 9.74% of total population of village. Average Sex Ratio of Gurholi village is 1005 which is higher than Maharashtra state average of 929. The Child Sex Ratio for the Gurholi as per census is 817, lower than the Maharashtra average of 894.

Gurholi village has lower literacy rate compared to Maharashtra. In 2011, literacy rate of Gurholi village was 79.28% compared to 82.34% of Maharashtra. In Gurholi Male literacy stands at 87.96% while female literacy rate was 70.83%.

References

https://villages.ws/india/maharashtra/pune/gurholi_purandar_0188477.htm

Villages in Pune district
Cities and towns in Pune district